KLKV may refer to:

 Lake County Airport (Oregon) (ICAO code KLKV)
 KLKV (FM), a radio station (99.9 FM) licensed to serve Hunt, Texas, United States